The 2014 season was FK Haugesund's 5th season back in the Tippeligaen since their promotion in 2009 and their 6th season with Jostein Grindhaug as manager. They finished the season in 11th position, were eliminated at the Quarter-finals stage of the Norwegian Cup by Stabæk and reached  Second qualifying round of the Europa League where they were defeated by FK Sarajevo.

Squad

Out on loan

Transfers

Winter

In:

Out:

Summer

In:

Out:

Competitions

Tippeligaen

Results summary

Results by round

Results

Table

Norwegian Cup

Europa League

Qualifying phase

Squad statistics

Appearances and goals

|-
|colspan="14"|Players away from the club on loan:

|-
|colspan="14"|Players who played for Haugesund that left during the season:

|}

Goal scorers

Disciplinary record

References

FK Haugesund seasons
Haugesund